Ignatius is the fifth studio album by American rapper Jadakiss. It was released through Def Jam Recordings on March 6, 2020, making it Jadakiss's first solo release since 2015's Top 5 Dead or Alive. The album features guest appearances from 2 Chainz, Chayse, DeJ Loaf, Emanny, John Legend, Millyz, Nino Man, Pusha T, Rick Ross and Ty Dolla Sign. It was preceded by the release of the singles "Me" in 2019, "Kisses to the Sky" in January 2020, and "Hunting Season" in February 2020. The album received positive reviews from critics, getting general rating of 82 on Metacritic, becoming his best rated album.

Background
The album is named for the Ruff Ryders Entertainment A&R and record producer Ignatius "Icepick Jay" Jackson, who died in 2017. He is featured on the center of the album's cover art.

Release
Initially planned for a February 28, 2020 release date, the album was released on March 6, 2020. Jadakiss delayed the album's release out of respect due to the death of Pop Smoke, a 20-year-old American rapper who was murdered on February 19 by masked gunmen during a home invasion in the Hollywood Hills.

Track listing

Notes
 "Catch & Release" includes uncredited vocals from Justin Jesso.
 "Me" contains a sample from "Give Me Your Love" by Peabo Bryson.

Charts

References

2020 albums
Albums produced by Bryan-Michael Cox
Albums produced by Buckwild
Albums produced by Supa Dups
Def Jam Recordings albums
Jadakiss albums
Albums produced by Hitmaka